Robert R. Goguen KC (born January 24, 1957) is a Canadian former politician who served in the House of Commons of Canada from the 2011 election to the 2015 election. He represented the electoral district of Moncton—Riverview—Dieppe as a member of the Conservative Party, and served in the House of Commons as parliamentary secretary to the Minister of Justice and Attorney-General. He is the past president of the Progressive Conservative Party of New Brunswick.

Education 
Goguen graduated from the Université de Moncton in 1980 with a Bachelor of Business Administration. He then graduated in 1983 from the Université de Moncton with a law degree. He worked as an attorney at Actus Law for over 25 years.

Political career 
Goguen was elected MP for the Moncton—Riverview—Dieppe riding in the 2011 federal election, the first time a Conservative candidate had won the riding since 1988. Goguen ran for re-election in the 2015 federal election, placing second.

Controversy 
Goguen was the subject of press attention in July 2014 after comments at a meeting of the House of Commons Justice Committee, when he asked a woman, Timea Nagy, who was gang raped, if "the police authorities would have broken in and rescued you. Would your freedom of expression have been breached?." Many considered the question to be inappropriate, but both Nagy and the minister defended the question. Nagy has since said "While Mr. Goguen’s question was awkward, I was not personally offended."

Electoral history

References

External links
 

Members of the House of Commons of Canada from New Brunswick
Conservative Party of Canada MPs
Living people
1957 births
People from Moncton
21st-century Canadian politicians